Byadagi is a popular town in Haveri district, in the state of Karnataka, it is agricultural  business centre.

The town is known for its long, red Byadgi chilli. The areas surrounding Byadgi produce the chilli which is then dried in sunlight and sent to different markets.

Geography
It has an average elevation of 601 meters (1971 feet).

Demographics
 India census, Byadgi had a population of 30,014. Males constitute 51% of the population and females 49%. Byadgi has an average literacy rate of 67%, higher than the national average of 59.5%.  Male literacy is 74% and female literacy, 60%. 13% of the population is under 6 years of age.

Tourism
The sacred site, Kaginele is located in the Byadgi taluk and 15km northeast in the direction from Byadgi town. Kadaramandalagi is another sacred site which is located 6 km away from Byadgi. An idol of Lord Kantesha (Hanuman) is present in the temple.

Education 
Byadagi has a number of government and private schools and colleges which offer courses in PU, degree and other technical courses.

References

 Cities and towns in Haveri district